is a Japanese ice sledge hockey player and rower. He was part of the Japanese sledge hockey team that won a silver medal at the 2010 Winter Paralympics. He was also Japan's national flag bearer there. 
He was awarded the Whang Youn Dai Achievement Award that year.

He has a congenital deficiency in both legs.

References

External links 
 
 

1978 births
Living people
Japanese sledge hockey players
Paralympic sledge hockey players of Japan
Paralympic silver medalists for Japan
Ice sledge hockey players at the 2006 Winter Paralympics
Ice sledge hockey players at the 2010 Winter Paralympics
Ice sledge hockey players at the 2002 Winter Paralympics
Medalists at the 2010 Winter Paralympics
Sportspeople from Saitama Prefecture
Paralympic medalists in sledge hockey